Allen Ingvar Olson (born November 5, 1938) is an American Republican politician and attorney who served as the 28th governor of North Dakota from 1981 to 1985. He defeated incumbent Arthur A. Link in the 1980 election and served one term.

Education, military service and legal career
Olson was born on November 5, 1938, in the small town of Rolla, North Dakota. He received a law degree from the University of North Dakota where he joined Lambda Chi Alpha fraternity and served in the United States Army as a judge advocate general's corps lawyer. In 1967 he served as Chief of Military Justice in Munich, West Germany. From 1967 to 1969 he served as the assistant director of the Legislative Research Committee, which directed the state's first study of strip mining, soil banks and land reclamation. He entered the private practice of law in 1969 with the law firm of Conmy, Rosenberg, Lucas and Olson. He ran for attorney general in 1972 and served two terms in that position.

Years as governor
In 1980, Olson sought the governor's office and defeated incumbent Governor Arthur Link. His achievements during his term include the creation of the Department of Human Services and the conversion of the Cross-Ranch into a state park. He also worked with the Task Force on Drunk Driving and supported the Garrison Diversion program. A controversial lawsuit against the state by the Association of Retarded Citizens was also filed during his years as governor. He ran for reelection in 1984 but was defeated by Democrat George A. Sinner.

Later professional career
After losing the election and leaving office, he returned to private law practice in Bismarck for a year before leaving for Minneapolis to join the law firm of Fredrikson and Byron. In 1987, he left the firm to become co-owner of a die-casting company based in New Hope, Minnesota. He also ran a community bank association for many years. He serves as a commissioner of the International Joint Commission of Canada and the United States, having been appointed to the position by President George W. Bush in 2002.

On October 4, 2010, Olson announced that he was backing Independence Party candidate Tom Horner in the 2010 Minnesota gubernatorial election.

References

1938 births
American Presbyterians
American people of Norwegian descent
Republican Party governors of North Dakota
United States Army Judge Advocate General's Corps
North Dakota Attorneys General
University of North Dakota alumni
Living people
People from Rolette County, North Dakota
Military personnel from North Dakota
20th-century American politicians